In the knockout stage of the 1957 African Cup of Nations, there were two semi-finals scheduled, but South Africa were disqualified due to apartheid, meaning that Ethiopia were awarded a bye to the final. The match was held in Khartoum on 10 February.

Bracket

1 The second semi-final was scratched and Ethiopia were advanced to the final after South Africa were disqualified due to apartheid.

Semi-finals

Sudan vs Egypt

Ethiopia vs South Africa

Final

References

External links
, rsssf.com

Knockout stage